The Bayer designation Pi Cygni (π Cyg / π Cygni) is shared by two stars, in the constellation Cygnus:
π¹ Cygni
π² Cygni

All of them were member of asterism 騰蛇 (Téng Shé), Flying Serpent, Encampment mansion.

References

Cygni, Pi
Cygnus (constellation)